Mutuality can refer to:
 Mutualism (disambiguation)
 Reciprocity (disambiguation)